The following is a list of the 348 communes of the Côtes-d'Armor department of France.

The communes cooperate in the following intercommunalities (as of 2020):
Communauté d'agglomération Dinan Agglomération
Communauté d'agglomération Guingamp-Paimpol Agglomération
Communauté d'agglomération Lamballe Terre et Mer
Communauté d'agglomération Lannion-Trégor Communauté
Communauté d'agglomération Saint-Brieuc Armor Agglomération
Communauté de communes Côte d'Émeraude (partly)
Communauté de communes du Kreiz-Breizh
Communauté de communes Leff Armor Communauté
Communauté de communes Loudéac Communauté − Bretagne Centre
Communauté de communes Poher Communauté (partly)
Communauté de communes Pontivy Communauté (partly)

References

Cotes-d'Armor